Balbura intervenata is a moth of the subfamily Arctiinae. It is found in Panama, Costa Rica and Honduras.

References

Lithosiini